The Harvard–Yenching Library is the primary location for East Asia-related collections at Harvard Library. In addition to East Asian languages (Chinese, Japanese, Korean, Tibetan, Manchu, and Mongolian), it houses collections in European languages and Southeast Asian language (Vietnamese). Totaling more than 1.5 million volumes, the Harvard-Yenching Library has one of the largest collections in East Asian studies outside of Asia. The library has been located at 2 Divinity Avenue on the Cambridge campus of Harvard University since around 1957. The building was originally built in 1929 for Harvard's Institute of Geographical Exploration and currently houses part of the Harvard-Yenching Institute and the Department of East Asian Languages and Civilizations, in addition to the Harvard-Yenching Library.

History
In 1879, Ko K'un-hua, a scholar from China, was engaged to teach the first course in the Chinese language offered at Harvard University. The small collection of books that was purchased for this course became Harvard College Library's first acquisitions in any East Asian language. In 1914, two Japanese professors (Masaharu Anesaki) came from Tokyo Imperial University to lecture at Harvard. They donated several important sets of Japanese publications on Sinology and Buddhism to the Harvard College Library, thus launching Harvard's Japanese collection. In 1927, Archibald Cary Coolidge, head of Harvard's libraries, asked , then a graduate student at Harvard, to organize and catalog these collections. The library was formally founded in 1928, as the Chinese-Japanese Library of the Harvard-Yenching Institute.

Following World War II, the library began collecting more social science publications. The once predominantly humanistic collection evolved into a research library that encompasses East Asian materials in all academic disciplines. A. Kaiming Chiu served as head librarian of the library until his retirement in 1964, after which he was succeeded by Eugene W. Wu. In 1965, the Chinese-Japanese Library of the Harvard-Yenching Institute was renamed the Harvard-Yenching Library to reflect the expanded nature of the library's collections. The Library eventually added Tibetan, Mongolian and Manchu publications, as well as Western language monographs and journals. A Korean collection was added in 1951, and a Vietnamese collection in 1973. In 1976, management of the library shifted from the independent Harvard-Yenching Institute to the Harvard College Library. In 1998, Eugene Wu retired and was succeeded by James Cheng. James Cheng retired at the end of 2020. During his time as head librarian, he oversaw large-scale digitization of the library's rare and special collections. James Cheng was succeeded by Jidong Yang in August 2022.

The 75th Anniversary of the Harvard-Yenching Library was celebrated in 2003 with a symposium and the publication of a volume of scholarly articles on the history of the Library and its collections. In 2009, the library announced a  six-year, multimillion-dollar project to digitize major sections of its rare books collection in cooperation with the National Library of China.

References

External links
 Website
 Publications
 Facebook

Harvard Library
Libraries in Massachusetts
Harvard University buildings
1928 establishments in Massachusetts
Libraries in Middlesex County, Massachusetts
Libraries established in 1928
Sinology